The following is an alphabetical list of heya or training stables in professional sumo.  All belong to one of five groups, called ichimon. These groups, led by the stable by which each group is named, are in order of size: Dewanoumi ichimon, Nishonoseki ichimon, Tokitsukaze ichimon, Takasago ichimon and Isegahama ichimon.  Occasionally there have been independent stables, but the Japan Sumo Association agreed at a director's meeting in July 2018 that all sumo elders must belong to one of the five ichimon. The founding dates listed below are for the current incarnation of each stable; in most cases this is not the first stable to exist under a given name, however.

The number of stables peaked at 54, with the opening of Onoe stable in August 2006. In order to limit the over-proliferation of stables, the Japan Sumo Association introduced new rules the following month that greatly raised the qualifications needed by former wrestlers wishing to branch out (namely, those ranked below yokozuna or ōzeki must have spent at least 60 tournaments in the top makuuchi division or 25 in the titled san'yaku ranks). Discounting the special circumstances of the temporary closure of Kise stable from 2010 until 2012, there were no new stables established for more than six years, while eleven folded, bringing the number of active stables down to 43. This sequence was ended by the opening of former yokozuna Musashimaru's Musashigawa stable in April 2013. Since this time the opening and closing of stables has stabilized and the number of stables has remained in the mid 40s.

Pronunciation note
Due to a Japanese speech phenomenon known as rendaku, when the word for stable, heya, comes second in a compound word, the "h" in heya changes to "b" to become beya.  A sumo stable is pronounced in Japanese as "sumo-beya" and Arashio stable, as an example, is pronounced "Arashio-beya".

Active stables
There are 44 stables as of December 2022.
{| class="sortable wikitable"
! Name
! Ichimon
! Year opened
!class="unsortable"|Notable active wrestlers
!class="unsortable"|Notable past wrestlers
!class="unsortable"|Other notable information
|-
| Ajigawa||Isegahama||2022||||||head is former Aminishiki, branched off from Isegahama stable
|-
| Arashio||Tokitsukaze||2002||Kōtokuzan, Wakatakakage, Wakamotoharu||Sōkokurai||head is former Sōkokurai, made headlines when it welcomed back exonerated Sōkokurai in 2013
|-
|Asahiyama||Isegahama||2016||||||head is former Kotonishiki, branched off from Oguruma stable
|-
| Asakayama||Isegahama||2014||Kaishō  ||||head is former Kaiō, branched off from Tomozuna stable 
|-
| Dewanoumi||Dewanoumi||1862 (c.)||Mitakeumi||Chiyonoyama, Mainoumi, Mienoumi, Tochigiyama|| head is former Oginohana, demotion of its last sekitori left the stable without any sekitori for the first time since 1898
|-
| Fujishima||Dewanoumi||1981||Bushozan||Shōtenrō, Dejima, Miyabiyama, Musashimaru, Musōyama, Wakanoyama||head is former Musōyama, was the strongest stable in early 2000s, name was changed from its previous incarnation as Musashigawa
|-
|Futagoyama||Dewanoumi||2018||||||Head is former Miyabiyama, branched off from Fujishima stable
|-
| Hakkaku||Takasago||1993||Hokutōfuji,  || Hokutōriki, Kaihō, Okinoumi ||head is former Hokutoumi, branched off from Kokonoe stable
|-
| Hanaregoma||Nishonoseki||1990||Ichiyamamoto,  ||Shōhōzan||head is former Tamanoshima, branched off from Futagoyama stable
|-
| Ikazuchi||Dewanoumi||1993|||| Masatsukasa, Yōtsukasa, Sagatsukasa||head is former Kakizoe, who inherited the stable from former Tochitsukasa who branched off from Kasugano stable
|-
| Isegahama||Isegahama||1979||Takarafuji, Terunofuji, Terutsuyoshi, Midorifuji, Nishikifuji ||Aminishiki, Asōfuji, Harumafuji, Homarefuji, Kasugafuji|| head is former Asahifuji, until 2018 one of the most well represented stables in the upper divisions, renamed from its original incarnation as Ajigawa stable
|-
| Isenoumi||Tokitsukaze||1949||Nishikigi, Kagamiō||Hattori, Ikioi, Kashiwado, Tosanoumi|| head is former Kitakachidoki, the Isenoumi name has one of the longest traditions in sumo
|-
| Kasugano||Dewanoumi||1925||Aoiyama, Tochinoshin||Tochinishiki, Tochinoumi, Tochihikari, Tochinowaka, Tochiōzan || head is former Tochinowaka, active since the Meiji era, currently one of the most successful stables
|-
| Kataonami||Nishonoseki||1961||, Tamawashi ||Tamaasuka, Tamakiyama, Tamaryū||head is former Tamakasuga, branched off from Nishonoseki stable
|-
|Kise||Dewanoumi||2003||Akiseyama, Hidenoumi, Kinbozan, Shimanoumi, Tokushōryū, Ura||Gagamaru, Jōkōryū, Kiyoseumi, Tokushinho, ||head is former Higonoumi, was dissolved over a ticket selling scandal, then allowed to reform two years later, well represented in two top divisions
|-
| Kokonoe||Takasago||1967||Chiyoarashi, Chiyomaru, Chiyonokuni, Chiyoshōma||Chiyonofuji, Chiyoōtori, Chiyotaikai, Chiyotairyū, Chiyotenzan, Hokutoumi, Kitanofuji, Kitaseumi, Takanofuji||head is former Chiyotaikai, as of March 2018 five of its 17 wrestlers were sekitori
|-
| Michinoku||Tokitsukaze||1974|| Kiribayama ||Hoshitango, Jūmonji, Kakuryū, Ryūhō, Toyozakura ||head is former Kirishima, lost the largest number of wrestlers to the 2011 match fixing scandal
|-
| Minato||Nishonoseki||1982||Ichinojō ||||head is former Minatofuji, who is the only top division wrestler the stable had ever produced until Ichinojō in 2014.
|-
| Miyagino||Isegahama||1958||Enhō, Hokuseihō, Ishiura, Ochiai||Hakuhō, Myōbudani, Mutsuarashi, Kōbō, Ryūō, ||head is former Hakuhō, has had a convoluted series of successions
|-
| Musashigawa||Dewanoumi||2013||||Wakaichirō||head is former Musashimaru, who is only the second foreign born wrestler to open his own stable
|-
|Naruto||Nishonoseki||2017||||||head is former Kotoōshū, branched off from Sadogatake stable
|-
|Nishiiwa||Nishonoseki||2018||||||head is former Wakanosato, branched off from Tagonoura stable
|-
| Nishikido||Takasago||2002|| Mitoryū||||head is former Mitoizumi, was home to the only Kazakh wrestler
|-
| Nishonoseki||Nishonoseki||2021||Tomokaze || ||founder and head is the former Kisenosato, the 72nd yokozuna; branched off from Tagonoura stable
|-
| Oitekaze||Tokitsukaze||1998||Daiamami, Daieishō, Daishoho, Daishōmaru, Endō, Tobizaru, Tsurugishō ||Hayateumi, Kokkai, Hamanishiki||head is former Daishōyama who branched off from Tatsunami stable
|-
| Onoe||Dewanoumi||2006||||Baruto, Satoyama, Tenkaihō, Yamamotoyama||head is former Hamanoshima, branched off from Mihogaseki stable, lost three sekitori wrestlers due to match fixing scandal in 2011
|-
| oŌnomatsu||Nishonoseki||1994||, Ōnoshō|| Daidō, Katayama, Wakakōyū, Amūru||head is former Daidō, forced out of Nishonoseki ichimon and joined Takanohana ichimon in 2010
|-
| o Ōshima||Isegahama||1941||Kyokutaisei||Kyokushūhō, Asahishō, Kaiō, Kyokutenhō, Kyokudōzan, Kyokushūzan, Sentoryū, Tachiyama, Kaisei ||head is former Kyokutenhō, incarnations have a long and prestigious history, absorbed a number of strong wrestlers in 2012 from a previous, now defunct Ōshima stable
|-
|Oshiogawa||Nishonoseki||2022||Yago, Amakaze||||head is former Takekaze, branched from Oguruma stable upon its closure
|-
|oŌtake||Nishonoseki||1971||Ōhō|| Ōzutsu, Rohō, Ōsunaarashi||head is former Dairyū, the previous head (former Takatōriki) was forced out in a gambling scandal
|-
| Sadogatake||Nishonoseki||1955||Kotoeko, Kotonowaka, Kotoshōhō, ||Hasegawa, Kotokaze, Kotomitsuki, Kotonishiki, Kotoshōgiku, Kotoōshū, Kotozakura, Kotoyūki||head is former Kotonowaka, has produced many wrestlers in makuuchi and san'yaku over the years
|-
| Sakaigawa||Dewanoumi||1998|| Myōgiryū, Sadanoumi, Hiradoumi, ||Gōeidō, Iwakiyama, Hochiyama, Sadanofuji, Toyohibiki||head is former Ryōgoku, has produced many sekitori
|- 
| Shibatayama||Nishonoseki||1999||||Daishōchi,  ||head is former Ōnokuni, in 2013 absorbed its parent stable (Hanaregoma), its only home-grown sekitori quit under acrimonious circumstances
|-
| Shikihide||Dewanoumi||1992||||||head is former Kitazakura, took almost 20 years to produce a sekitori in 2012
|-
| Shikoroyama||Nishonoseki||2004||Abi, || Hōmashō, Seirō,  ||head is former Terao, when he branched off from Izutsu stable, he unusually chose to start from scratch and take no wrestlers with him
|-
| Tagonoura||Nishonoseki||1989||Takayasu||Kisenosato, Rikiō, Takanowaka, Takanoyama, Wakanosato ||head is former Takanotsuru, founded by yokozuna Takanosato but renamed from Naruto and moved to Ryōgoku following his death
|-
| Takadagawa||Nishonoseki||1974||, Kagayaki, Ryūden,   || Kenkō, Maenoshin, Shobushi||head is former Akinoshima, stable was ousted from Takasago ichimon in 1998, finally accepted into Nishonoseki ichimon in 2013
|-
| Takasago||Takasago||1878||Asabenkei, Asanoyama, Asagyokusei, ||Asashio, Asashōryū, Azumafuji, Konishiki, Maedayama, Takamiyama||head is former Asasekiryū, the second oldest and arguably one of the most successful stables throughout its history
|-
|Takekuma||Dewanoumi||2022|| ||||head is former Gōeidō, branched off from Sakaigawa stable
|-
| Tamanoi||Dewanoumi||1990||Azumaryū, Fujiazuma, Tōhakuryū, Yoshiazuma||Ryūkō||head is former Tochiazuma Daisuke, passed onto him by his father, the stable's founder Tochiazuma Tomoyori
|-
| Tatsunami||Dewanoumi||1916||Akua, Hōshōryū, Meisei ||Annenyama, Futabayama, Futahaguro, Haguroyama,  Hanakaze, Mōkonami ||head is former Asahiyutaka, one of the most prestigious stables in sumo but declined by the 1980s
|-
| Tokitsukaze||Tokitsukaze||1941||Shōdai ||Yutakayama, Kitabayama, Kurama, Ōshio, Tokitenkū, Aogiyama, Toyonoshima||founded by Futabayama, head is former Tosayutaka who took over when previous head (former Tokitsuumi) was expelled for failure to follow COVID-19 protocols
|-
| Tokiwayama||Nishonoseki||2004||Takanoshō, Takakeishō, Takakento|| Masunoyama, Takagenji, Takanofuji, Takanoiwa||head is former Takamisugi, branched off from Kasugano stable
|-
| Yamahibiki||Dewanoumi||1985||Kitaharima, ||Hakurozan, Kitazakura, Kitataiki, Ōrora||head is former Ganyū who inherited it on the death of founder Kitanoumi, who branched off from Mihogaseki
|}

Mergers and closures (1994 to present) 
Oguruma stable closes February 2022, personnel split between Oshiogawa stable and Nishonoseki stable
Kagamiyama stable closes July 2021, all wrestlers and personnel move to Isenoumi stable
Azumazeki stable closes April 2021, wrestlers move to Hakkaku stable
Minezaki stable closes April 2021, wrestlers move to Shibatayama stable, some other personnel to Takadagawa stable and Nishiiwa stable
Nakagawa stable closes July 2020, wrestlers and/or personnel move to Arashio, Asahiyama, Isenoumi, Kataonami, Miyagino, Oitekaze, Tokitsukaze, and Tomozuna stables
Izutsu stable closes September 2019, wrestlers and personnel move to Michinoku stable
Takanohana stable closes October 2018, wrestlers and personnel move to Chiganoura stable
Kasugayama stable closes October 2016, some wrestlers retire, other wrestlers and personnel move to Oitekaze stable
Asahiyama stable closes January 2015, all wrestlers and some personnel move to Isegahama, some other personnel move to Asakayama.
Mihogaseki stable closes October 2013, wrestlers move to Kasugano
Magaki stable closes March 2013, wrestlers move to Isegahama
Hanaregoma stable closes February 2013, wrestlers move to Shibatayama
Nishonoseki stable closes January 2013, remaining wrestlers retire, other personnel move to Matsugane
Nakamura stable closes December 2012, wrestlers move to Azumazeki
Hanakago stable closes May 2012, wrestlers move to Minezaki
Ōshima stable closes April 2012, wrestlers move to Tomozuna
Tagonoura stable closes February 2012, wrestlers move to Dewanoumi and Kasugano
Takashima stable closes June 2011, head coach moves to Kasugayama
Kiriyama stable closes January 2011, wrestlers move to Asahiyama
Araiso stable closes September 2008, one remaining wrestler moves to Hanakago
Isegahama stable closes February 2007, wrestlers move to Kiriyama
Hatachiyama stable closes June 2006, wrestlers move to Kitanoumi 
Oshiogawa stable closes March 2005, wrestlers move to Oguruma
Takekuma Stable closes March 2004, no wrestlers are left but head coach moves to Tomozuna 
Kabutoyama stable closes December 2002, no wrestlers are left but head coach moves to Minato
Wakamatsu stable merges with Takasago in February 2002
Tatsutagawa stable closes November 2000, wrestlers move to Michinoku
Kise stable closes February 2000, wrestlers move to Kiriyama
Kumagatani stable closes April 1996, wrestlers move to Tatsunami
Ōnaruto stable closes December 1994, wrestlers move to Kiriyama

Name changes (2003 to present) 
Irumagawa beya is renamed Ikazuchi stable in January 2023.
Tomozuna stable is renamed Ōshima stable in February 2022.
Nishonoseki stable is renamed Hanaregoma stable in December 2021.
Araiso stable is renamed Nishonoseki stable in December 2021.
Chiganoura stable is renamed  Tokiwayama stable in November 2020.
Kitanoumi stable is renamed Yamahibiki stable in November 2015.
Matsugane stable is renamed Nishonoseki stable in December 2014.
Naruto stable is renamed Tagonoura stable in December 2013.
Musashigawa stable is renamed Fujishima stable in September 2010.
Ajigawa stable is renamed Isegahama stable in November 2007.
Futagoyama stable is renamed Takanohana stable in February 2004.
Taihō stable is renamed Ōtake stable in February 2003.
Nakadachi stable is renamed Sakaigawa stable in January 2003.

See also
List of sumo elders
Heya - sumo stable information
Japan Sumo Association
Toshiyori - sumo elder information
List of active sumo wrestlers
List of past sumo wrestlers
List of yokozuna
Glossary of sumo terms

References

External links
Map of Sumo Association heya and official venues 
Japan Sumo Association list of heya

Stables